The 2022 ISTAF World Cup was the third edition of the ISTAF World Cup, held from November 25-29, 2022, at the Daejeon Hanbat Sports Complex in Daejeon, South Korea. The tournament was conducted by the International Sepaktakraw Federation (ISTAF) in collaboration with the South Korea Sepak Takraw Association and the Daejeon Metropolitan Sports Association. Originally, the event was scheduled to be held in October 2019 in Goa, India, but was postponed to 2022 due to the COVID-19 pandemic, and the venue was also relocated to Daejeon, South Korea.

Thirteen ISTAF membership countries were confirmed to participate, making it the lowest number of participating nations since the tournament's inception in 2011. The game consisted of three categories, including men's, women's, and mixed, of which the first two categories were conducted in the group tournament ranking system and were additionally divided into two events: regu and quadrant, while the mixed only happened in the quadrant event and was played in the round-robin system. Due to a large number of participating teams, the men's category was further divided based on the previous tournament's performances into two divisions, including Division 1 (D1) and the Premier Division (PM).

Thailand won the tournament with four gold medals in all of the premier division's events they participated in,  followed by the United States, which won all of the two events in the division 1 segment, and India was ranked third by winning one in the mixed quadrant.

History
After the completion of the 2017 ISTAF World Cup in Hyderabad, India, the secretary-general and director-general of the International Sepaktakraw Federation (ISTAF), Dato Abdul Halim Bin Khader, announced the hosting of the following tournament in Goa, India, at a press conference held in February at the chamber of Sports Authority of Telangana State (SATS) with the support of the Government of Telangana and the Telangana State Olympic Association, but the date has not yet been finalized. However, due to the impact of the COVID-19 pandemic, the tournament was later postponed indefinitely.

Since the outbreak condition has improved, the ISTAF has sought a host for the tournament's third edition, in which South Korea interested. The MOU agreement ceremony to organize the event between the International Sepak Takraw Federation, Daejeon Metropolitan City, the Daejeon Metropolitan Sports Association, and the Korea Sepaktakraw Association, happened on September 28, 2022, at Daejeon Metropolitan City Hall, making it the first international Sepaktakraw tournament to be held in Korea after the 2017 Cittaslow International Sepaktakraw Tournament in Jeonju. The competition formats were also unveiled at the aforementioned occasion. More than 400 athletes from 15 countries were expected to participate in the tournament, which would be held from November 25-29, 2022, at the Daejeon Hanbat Sports Complex in the city of Daejeon.

Participating countries

Results summary

Final standings

Medal table

Group stage
Color legend
 Women's categories
 Men's categories
 Mixed category

Regu

Group A: WR-PM GrA

Group B: WR-PM GrB

Group C: MR-D1 GrC

Group D: MR-D1 GrD

Group G: MR-PM GrG

Group H: MR-PM GrH

Quadrant

Group I: WQ-PM GrI

Group J: WQ-PM GrJ

Group K: MQ-D1 GrK

Group L: MQ-D1 GrL

Group M: MQ-PM GrM

Group N: MQ-PM GrN

Mixed quadrant

Final round

Regu

Women: WR-PM

Men's Division 1: MR-D1

Men's Premier: MR-PM

Quadrant

Women: WQ-PM

Men's Division 1: MQ-D1

Men's Premier: MQ-PM

References

ISTAF World Cup
ISTAF World Cup
ISTAF World Cup
Sport in Daejeon